Horomui Dam  is a rockfill dam located in Hokkaido Prefecture in Japan. The dam is used for irrigation. The catchment area of the dam is 28.7 km2. The dam impounds about 63  ha of land when full and can store 8340 thousand cubic meters of water. The construction of the dam was started on 1971 and completed in 1990.

References

Dams in Hokkaido